Mario Foglia (13 January 1921 – 28 May 1999) was an Italian professional footballer who played as a defender and football manager.

Honours

Club 
A.C. Milan
Serie A: 1950–51

References

External links 
Profile at MagliaRossonera.it 

1921 births
1999 deaths
Italian footballers
Association football defenders
Serie A players
Serie B players
U.S. Alessandria Calcio 1912 players
F.C. Pavia players
Brescia Calcio players
A.C. Milan players
Palermo F.C. players
Italian football managers
A.S.D. La Biellese players